John James Bowlen (July 21, 1876 – December 16, 1959) was a Canadian rancher, farmer, provincial politician and the seventh Lieutenant Governor of Alberta.  Upon the death of his wife, his eldest daughter, Mary Bowlen Mooney became official hostess as "Lady to His Honour the Lieutenant Governor."

References

External links
 Official biography

1876 births
1959 deaths
Lieutenant Governors of Alberta
Alberta Liberal Party MLAs